Oridam is a 2005 Indian Malayalam film, directed by  Pradeep Nair, starring Vishnu and Geethu Mohandas in the lead roles. Oridam movie is a quest of a sex worker to find a place for herself in the society. The very same society, which uses and throws her. The reason for a woman being thrown into the street could be the same, anywhere in the world. The pains, sufferings, dreams and the thoughts of a new life tormented her. She lived weighing herself between the right and the wrong.

The sex worker (Geethu Mohandas) who doesn't have a name, nor does many of the other characters in the movie. The protagonists has a simple dream. A dream of leading a decent life, one that doesn't have anything to do with the flesh trade.

Awards

 Special Jury Award in Direction-52nd National Film Awards
 Special Jury Award in Direction-Kerala State Film Awards
 Best Actress-Kerala State Film Awards
 Best Background Score- Kerala State Film Awards
 Best Costume Design - Kerala State Film Awards
 Best Film Processing-Kerala State Film Awards
 Kerala Film Critics Association Awards – director, actress, sound mixing

Cast
 KPAC Lalitha 
 Vishnu 
 Baby Malu 
 CK Babu
 Geethu Mohandas 
 Martin Chalissery 
 PS Radhakrishnan 
 Ponni
 Swapna Sathyan
 Sathyan 
 TS Raju

References

External links

 Official page

2005 films
2000s Malayalam-language films